Lenka is a village and municipality in the Rimavská Sobota District of the Banská Bystrica Region of southern Slovakia.

Demographics 
In 2001, Lenka had 202 inhabitants of whom 129 were Hungarians and 72 Slovaks.

External links
https://web.archive.org/web/20080111223415/http://www.statistics.sk/mosmis/eng/run.html

Villages and municipalities in Rimavská Sobota District